are the logographic Chinese characters taken from the Chinese script, and used in the writing of Japanese. They were made a major part of the Japanese writing system during the time of Old Japanese and are still used, along with the subsequently-derived syllabic scripts of hiragana and katakana. The characters have Japanese pronunciations; most have two, with one based on the Chinese sound. A few characters were invented in Japan by constructing character components derived from other Chinese characters. After World War II, Japan made its own efforts to simplify the characters, now known as shinjitai, by a process similar to China's simplification efforts, with the intention to increase literacy among the common folk. Since the 1920s, the Japanese government has published character lists periodically to help direct the education of its citizenry through the myriad Chinese characters that exist. There are nearly 3,000 kanji used in Japanese names and in common communication.

The term kanji in Japanese literally means "Han characters". It is written in Japanese by using the same characters as in traditional Chinese, and both refer to the character writing system known in Chinese as hanzi. The significant use of Chinese characters in Japan first began to take hold around the 5th century AD and has since had a profound influence in shaping Japanese culture, language, literature, history, and records. Inkstone artifacts at archaeological sites dating back to the earlier Yayoi period were also found to contain Chinese characters.

Although some characters, as used in Japanese and Chinese, have similar meanings and pronunciations, others have meanings or pronunciations that are unique to one language or the other. For example,  means 'honest' in both languages but is pronounced makoto or sei in Japanese, and chéng in Standard Mandarin Chinese. Individual kanji characters invented in Japan, or multi-kanji words coined in Japanese, have also influenced and been borrowed into Chinese, Korean, and Vietnamese in recent times. For example, the word for telephone,  denwa in Japanese, is calqued as diànhuà in Mandarin Chinese, điện thoại in Vietnamese and  jeonhwa in Korean.

History

Chinese characters first came to Japan on official seals, letters, swords, coins, mirrors, and other decorative items imported from China. The earliest known instance of such an import was the King of Na gold seal given by Emperor Guangwu of Han to a Wa emissary in 57 AD. Chinese coins as well as inkstones from the first century AD have also been found in Yayoi period archaeological sites. However, the Japanese people of that era probably had little to no comprehension of the script, and they would remain relatively illiterate until the fifth century AD, when writing in Japan became more widespread. According to the Nihon Shoki and Kojiki, a semi-legendary scholar called Wani was dispatched to Japan by the Kingdom of Baekje during the reign of Emperor Ōjin in the early fifth century, bringing with him knowledge of Confucianism and Chinese characters.

The earliest Japanese documents were probably written by bilingual Chinese or Korean officials employed at the Yamato court. For example, the diplomatic correspondence from King Bu of Wa to Emperor Shun of Liu Song in 478 AD has been praised for its skillful use of allusion. Later, groups of people called fuhito were organized under the monarch to read and write Classical Chinese. During the reign of Empress Suiko (593–628), the Yamato court began sending full-scale diplomatic missions to China, which resulted in a large increase in Chinese literacy at the Japanese court.

In ancient times, paper was so rare that people wrote kanji onto thin, rectangular strips of wood, called mokkan. These wooden boards were used for communication between government offices, tags for goods transported between various countries, and the practice of writing. The oldest written kanji in Japan discovered so far were written in ink on wood as a wooden strip dated to the 7th century, a record of trading for cloth and salt.

The Japanese language had no written form at the time Chinese characters were introduced, and texts were written and read only in Chinese. Later, during the Heian period (794–1185), a system known as kanbun emerged, which involved using Chinese text with diacritical marks to allow Japanese speakers to read Chinese sentences and restructure them into Japanese on the fly, by changing word order and adding particles and verb endings, in accordance with the rules of Japanese grammar. This was essentially a kind of codified sight translation.

Chinese characters also came to be used to write texts in the vernacular Japanese language, resulting in the modern kana syllabaries. Around 650 AD, a writing system called man'yōgana (used in the ancient poetry anthology Man'yōshū) evolved that used a number of Chinese characters for their sound, rather than for their meaning. Man'yōgana written in cursive style evolved into hiragana (literally "fluttering kana" in reference to the motion of the brush during cursive writing), or onna-de, that is, "ladies' hand", a writing system that was accessible to women (who were denied higher education). Major works of Heian-era literature by women were written in hiragana. Katakana (literally "partial kana", in reference to the practice of using a part of a kanji character) emerged via a parallel path: monastery students simplified man'yōgana to a single constituent element. Thus the two other writing systems, hiragana and katakana, referred to collectively as kana, are descended from kanji. In contrast with kana (literally "borrowed name", in reference to the character being "borrowed" as a label for its sound), kanji are also called mana (literally "true name", in reference to the character being used as a label for its meaning).

In modern Japanese, kanji are used to write certain words or parts of words (usually content words such as nouns, adjective stems, and verb stems), while hiragana are used to write inflected verb and adjective endings, phonetic complements to disambiguate readings (okurigana), particles, and miscellaneous words which have no kanji or whose kanji are considered obscure or too difficult to read or remember. Katakana are mostly used for representing onomatopoeia, non-Japanese loanwords (except those borrowed from ancient Chinese), the names of plants and animals (with exceptions), and for emphasis on certain words.

Orthographic reform and lists of kanji

Since ancient times, there has been a strong opinion in Japan that kanji is the orthodox form of writing, but there were also people who argued against it. Kamo no Mabuchi, a scholar of the Edo period, criticized the large number of characters in kanji. He also appreciated the small number of characters in kana characters and argued for the limitation of kanji.

After the Meiji Restoration and as Japan entered an era of active exchange with foreign countries, the need for script reform in Japan began to be called for. Some scholars argued for the abolition of kanji and the writing of Japanese using only kana or Latin characters. However, these views were not so widespread.

However, the need to limit the number of kanji characters was understood, and in May 1923, the Japanese government announced 1,962 kanji characters for regular use.

In 1946, after World War II and under the Allied Occupation of Japan, the Japanese government, guided by the Supreme Commander of the Allied Powers, instituted a series of orthographic reforms, to help children learn and to simplify kanji use in literature and periodicals.

The number of characters in circulation was reduced, and formal lists of characters to be learned during each grade of school were established.
Some characters were given simplified glyphs, called . Many variant forms of characters and obscure alternatives for common characters were officially discouraged.

Kyōiku kanji

The  are the 1,026 first kanji characters that Japanese children learn in elementary school, from first grade to sixth grade. This list of kanji is maintained by the Japanese Ministry of Education and prescribes which kanji characters and which kanji readings students should learn for each grade.

Jōyō kanji

In publishing, characters outside this category are often given . Originally numbering 1,945 characters, the  list was expanded to 2,136 in 2010.

Jinmeiyō kanji

As of September 25, 2017, the  consists of 863 characters. There were only 92 kanji in the original list published in 1952, but new additions have been made frequently.

Hyōgai kanji

These are generally written using traditional characters, but extended shinjitai forms exist.

Japanese Industrial Standards for kanji
The Japanese Industrial Standards for kanji and kana define character code-points for each kanji and kana, as well as other forms of writing such as the Latin alphabet, Cyrillic script, Greek alphabet, Arabic numerals, etc. for use in information processing. They have had numerous revisions. The current standards are:
JIS X 0208, the most recent version of the main standard. It has 6,355 kanji.
JIS X 0212, a supplementary standard containing a further 5,801 kanji. This standard is rarely used, mainly because the common Shift JIS encoding system could not use it. This standard is effectively obsolete.
JIS X 0213, a further revision which extended the JIS X 0208 set with 3,695 additional kanji, of which 2,743 (all but 952) were in JIS X 0212. The standard is in part designed to be compatible with Shift JIS encoding.
JIS X 0221:1995, the Japanese version of the ISO 10646/Unicode standard.

Gaiji
 are kanji that are not represented in existing Japanese encoding systems. These include variant forms of common kanji that need to be represented alongside the more conventional glyph in reference works and can include non-kanji symbols as well.

 can be either user-defined characters, system-specific characters or third-party add-on products. Both are a problem for information interchange, as the code point used to represent an external character will not be consistent from one computer or operating system to another.

 were nominally prohibited in JIS X 0208-1997 where the available number of code-points was reduced to only 940. Most desktop and mobile systems have moved to Unicode negating the need for gaiji for most users. Nevertheless, they persist today in Japan's three major mobile phone information portals, where they are used for emoji (pictorial characters).

The Text Encoding Initiative uses a  element to encode any non-standard character or glyph, including gaiji.

Total number of kanji
There is no definitive count of kanji characters, just as there is none of Chinese characters generally. The Dai Kan-Wa Jiten, which is considered to be comprehensive in Japan, contains about 50,000 characters. The Zhonghua Zihai, published in 1994 in China, contains about 85,000 characters, but the majority of them are not in common use in any country, and many are obscure variants or archaic forms.

A list of 2,136 jōyō kanji (常用漢字) is regarded as necessary for functional literacy in Japanese. Approximately a thousand more characters are commonly used and readily understood by the majority in Japan and a few thousand more find occasional use, particularly in specialized fields of study but those may be obscure to most out of context. A total of 13,108 characters can be encoded in various Japanese Industrial Standards for kanji.

Readings

Because of the way they have been adopted into Japanese, a single kanji may be used to write one or more different words—or, in some cases, morphemes—and thus the same character may be pronounced in different ways. From the reader's point of view, kanji are said to have one or more different "readings". Although more than one reading may become activated in the brain, deciding which reading is appropriate depends on recognizing which word it represents, which can usually be determined from context, intended meaning, whether the character occurs as part of a compound word or an independent word, and sometimes location within the sentence. For example,  is usually read kyō, meaning "today", but in formal writing is instead read konnichi, meaning "nowadays"; this is understood from context. Nevertheless, some cases are ambiguous and require a furigana gloss, which are used to simplify difficult readings or to specify a non-standard reading.

Kanji readings are categorized as either on'yomi (literally "sound reading", from Chinese) or kun'yomi (literally "meaning reading", native Japanese), and most characters have at least two readings, at least one of each.

Most often, a character will be used for both sound and meaning, and it is simply a matter of choosing the correct reading based on which word it represents.

On'yomi (Sino-Japanese reading)   
The , the Sino-Japanese reading, is the modern descendant of the Japanese approximation of the base Chinese pronunciation of the character at the time it was introduced. It was often previously referred to as translation reading, as it was recreated readings of the Chinese pronunciation but was not the Chinese pronunciation or reading itself, similar to the English pronunciation of Latin loanwords. Old Japanese scripts often stated that on'yomi readings were also created by the Japanese during their arrival and re-borrowed by the Chinese as their own. There also exist kanji created by the Japanese and given an on'yomi reading despite not being a Chinese-derived or a Chinese-originating character. Some kanji were introduced from different parts of China at different times, and so have multiple on'yomi, and often multiple meanings. Kanji invented in Japan (kokuji) would not normally be expected to have on'yomi, but there are exceptions, such as the character  "to work", which has the kun'yomi "hatara(ku)" and the on'yomi "dō", and  "gland", which has only the on'yomi "sen"—in both cases these come from the on'yomi of the phonetic component, respectively  "dō" and  "sen".

Generally, on'yomi are classified into four types according to their region and time of origin:
 readings derive from the pronunciation used in the Northern and Southern dynasties of China during the 5th and 6th centuries, primarily from the speech of the capital Jiankang (today's Nanjing). They are related to Wu Chinese and the Shanghainese language.
 readings come from the pronunciation utilized during the Tang dynasty of China in the 7th to 9th centuries, primarily from the standard speech of the capital, Chang'an (modern Xi'an). Here, Kan refers to Han Chinese people or China proper.
 readings are based on the pronunciations of later dynasties of China, such as the Song and Ming. They cover all readings adopted from the Heian era to the Edo period.
  readings, which are mistaken or changed readings of the kanji that have become accepted into the Japanese language. In some cases, they are the actual readings that accompanied the character's introduction to Japan but do not match how the character "should" (is prescribed to) be read according to the rules of character construction and pronunciation.

The go-on, kan-on, and tō-on readings are generally cognate (with rare exceptions of homographs; see below), having a common origin in Old Chinese, and hence form linguistic doublets or triplets, but they can differ significantly from each other and from modern Chinese pronunciation.

In Chinese, most characters are associated with a single Chinese sound, though there are distinct literary and colloquial readings. Additionally, many Chinese syllables, especially those with an entering tone, did not fit the largely consonant-vowel (CV) phonotactics of classical Japanese. Thus most on'yomi are composed of two morae (beats), the second of which is either a lengthening of the vowel in the first mora (to ei, ō, or ū), the vowel i, or one of the syllables ku, ki, tsu, chi, fu (historically, later merged into ō and ū), or moraic n, chosen for their approximation to the final consonants of Middle Chinese. It may be that palatalized consonants before vowels other than i developed in Japanese as a result of Chinese borrowings, as they are virtually unknown in words of native Japanese origin, but are common in Chinese.

This borrowing process is often compared to the English borrowings from Latin, Greek, and Norman French, since Chinese-borrowed terms are often more specialized, or considered to sound more erudite or formal, than their native counterparts (occupying a higher linguistic register). The major exception to this rule is family names, in which the native kun'yomi are usually used (though on'yomi are found in many personal names, especially men's names).

Kun'yomi (native reading)  
The , the native reading, is a reading based on the pronunciation of a native Japanese word, or yamato kotoba, that closely approximated the meaning of the Chinese character when it was introduced. As with on'yomi, there can be multiple kun'yomi for the same kanji, and some kanji have no kun'yomi at all.

For instance, the character for east, has the on'yomi tō, from Middle Chinese . However, Japanese already had two words for "east": higashi and azuma. Thus the kanji  had the latter readings added as kun'yomi. In contrast, the kanji , denoting a Chinese unit of measurement (about 30 mm or 1.2 inch), has no native Japanese equivalent; it only has an on'yomi, sun, with no native kun'yomi. Most kokuji, Japanese-created Chinese characters, only have kun'yomi, although some have back-formed a pseudo-on'yomi by analogy with similar characters, such as  dō, from  dō, and there are even some, such as  sen "gland", that have only an on'yomi.

Kun'yomi are characterized by the strict (C)V syllable structure of yamato kotoba. Most noun or adjective kun'yomi are two to three syllables long, while verb kun'yomi are usually between one and three syllables in length, not counting trailing hiragana called okurigana. Okurigana are not considered to be part of the internal reading of the character, although they are part of the reading of the word. A beginner in the language will rarely come across characters with long readings, but readings of three or even four syllables are not uncommon. This contrasts with on'yomi, which are monosyllabic, and is unusual in the Chinese family of scripts, which generally use one character per syllable—not only in Chinese, but also in Korean, Vietnamese, and Zhuang; polysyllabic Chinese characters are rare and considered non-standard.

 uketamawaru,  kokorozashi, and  mikotonori have five syllables represented by a single kanji, the longest readings in the jōyō character set. These unusually long readings are due to a single character representing a compound word:

  is a single character for a compound verb, one component of which has a long reading.
 It has an alternative spelling as  u(ke)-tamawa(ru), hence (1+1)+3=5.
 Compare common  u(ke)-tsu(keru).
  is a nominalization of the verb  which has a long reading kokoroza(su).
 This is due to its being derived from a noun-verb compound,  kokoro-za(su).
 The nominalization removes the okurigana, hence increasing the reading by one mora, yielding 4+1=5.
 Compare common  hanashi 2+1=3, from  hana(su).
  is a triple compound.
 It has an alternative spelling  mi-koto-nori, hence 1+2+2=5.

In a number of cases, multiple kanji were assigned to cover a single Japanese word. Typically when this occurs, the different kanji refer to specific shades of meaning. For instance, the word , naosu, when written , means "to heal an illness or sickness". When written  it means "to fix or correct something". Sometimes the distinction is very clear, although not always. Differences of opinion among reference works are not uncommon; one dictionary may say the kanji are equivalent, while another dictionary may draw distinctions of use. As a result, native speakers of the language may have trouble knowing which kanji to use and resort to personal preference or by writing the word in hiragana.

Local dialectical readings of kanji are also classified under kun'yomi, most notably readings for words in Ryukyuan languages. Further, in rare cases gairaigo (borrowed words) have a single character associated with them, in which case this reading is formally classified as a kun'yomi, because the character is being used for meaning, not sound.

Ateji

Ateji (当て字, 宛字 or あてじ) are characters used only for their sounds. In this case, pronunciation is still based on a standard reading, or used only for meaning (broadly a form of ateji, narrowly jukujikun). Therefore, only the full compound—not the individual character—has a reading. There are also special cases where the reading is completely different, often based on a historical or traditional reading.

The analogous phenomenon occurs to a much lesser degree in Chinese varieties, where there are literary and colloquial readings of Chinese characters—borrowed readings and native readings. In Chinese these borrowed readings and native readings are etymologically related, since they are between Chinese varieties (which are related), not from Chinese to Japanese (which are not related). They thus form doublets and are generally similar, analogous to different on'yomi, reflecting different stages of Chinese borrowings into Japanese.

Gairaigo
Longer readings exist for non-Jōyō characters and non-kanji symbols, where a long gairaigo word may be the reading (this is classed as kun'yomi—see single character gairaigo, below)—the character  has the seven kana reading  senchimētoru "centimeter", though it is generally written as "cm" (with two half-width characters, so occupying one space); another common example is '%' (the percent sign), which has the five kana reading  pāsento.

Mixed readings  

It is the other way around with yu-tō (kun-on, 湯桶読み).

Note that in both these words, the on'yomi has a long vowel; long vowels in Japanese generally are derived from sound changes common to loans from Chinese, hence distinctive of on'yomi. These are the Japanese form of hybrid words.

Ateji often use mixed readings. For instance the city of Sapporo (サッポロ), whose name derives from the Ainu language and has no meaning in Japanese, is written with the on-kun compound  (which includes sokuon as if it were a purely on compound).

Special readings

Gikun and jukujikun are readings of kanji combinations that have no direct correspondence to the characters' individual on'yomi or kun'yomi.

Gikun are other readings assigned to a character instead of its standard readings. Another example is using  (lit. "smoke grass") with the reading tabako ("tobacco") rather than the otherwise-expected readings of kemuri-gusa or ensō. Some of these, such as for tabako, have become lexicalized, but in many cases this kind of use is typically non-standard and employed in specific contexts by individual writers. Aided with furigana, gikun could be used to convey complex literary or poetic effect (especially if the readings contradict the kanji), or clarification if the referent may not be obvious.

Jukujikun are when the standard kanji for a word are related to the meaning, but not the sound. The word is pronounced as a whole, not corresponding to sounds of individual kanji. For example,  ("this morning") is jukujikun. This word is not read as *ima'asa, the expected kun'yomi of the characters, and only infrequently as konchō, the on'yomi of the characters.

Sometimes, jukujikun can even have more kanji than there are syllables, examples being kera (“woodpecker”), gumi (“silver berry, oleaster”), and Hozumi (a surname). This phenomenon is observed in animal names that are shortened and used as suffixes for zoological compound names, for example when , normally read as koganemushi, is shortened to kogane in  kurokogane, although zoological names are commonly spelled with katakana rather than with kanji. Outside zoology, this type of shortening only occurs on a handful of words, for example  daigen(sui), or the historical male name suffix  -emon, which was shortened from the word uemon.

Jukujikun are quite varied. Often the kanji compound for jukujikun is idiosyncratic and created for the word, and there is no corresponding Chinese word with that spelling. In other cases a kanji compound for an existing Chinese word is reused, where the Chinese word and on'yomi may or may not be used in Japanese. For example,  (“reindeer”) is jukujikun for tonakai, from Ainu, but the on'yomi reading of junroku is also used.

The underlying word for jukujikun is a native Japanese word or foreign borrowing, which either does not have an existing kanji spelling (either kun'yomi or ateji) or for which a new kanji spelling is produced. Most often the word is a noun, which may be a simple noun (not a compound or derived from a verb), or may be a verb form or a fusional pronunciation. For example, the word  (sumō, “sumo”) is originally from the verb  (sumau, “to vie, to compete”), while  (kyō, “today”) is fusional (from older ke, “this” + fu, “day”). 

In rare cases jukujikun is also applied to inflectional words (verbs and adjectives), in which case there is frequently a corresponding Chinese word. The most common example of an inflectional jukujikun is the adjective  (kawai-i, “cute”), originally kawafayu-i; the word  is used in Chinese, but the corresponding on'yomi is not used in Japanese. Which reading to use can be discerned by the presence or absence of the -shii ending (okurigana). See the 義訓 and 熟字訓 articles in the Japanese Wikipedia for many more examples. Note that there are also compound verbs and, less commonly, compound adjectives, and while these may have multiple kanji without intervening characters, they are read using the usual kun'yomi.

Typographically, the furigana for jukujikun are often written so they are centered across the entire word, or for inflectional words over the entire root—corresponding to the reading being related to the entire word—rather than each part of the word being centered over its corresponding character, as is often done for the usual phono-semantic readings.

Broadly speaking, jukujikun can be considered a form of ateji, though in narrow usage "ateji" refers specifically to using characters for sound and not meaning (sound-spelling), whereas "jukujikun" refers to using characters for their meaning and not sound (meaning-spelling).

Many jukujikun (established meaning-spellings) began life as gikun (improvised meaning-spellings). Occasionally a single word will have many such kanji spellings.

Single character gairaigo
In some rare cases, an individual kanji has a reading that is borrowed from a modern foreign language (gairaigo), though most often these words are written in katakana. See list of single character gairaigo for more. These are classed as kun'yomi of a single character, because the character is being used for meaning only (without the Chinese pronunciation), rather than as ateji, which is the classification used when a gairaigo term is written as a compound (2 or more characters). However, unlike the vast majority of other kun'yomi, these readings are not native Japanese, but rather borrowed, so the "kun'yomi" label can be misleading. The readings are also written in katakana, unlike the usual hiragana for native kun'yomi.

Nanori

Some kanji also have lesser-known readings called , which are mostly used for names (often given names) and, in general, are closely related to the kun'yomi. Place names sometimes also use nanori or, occasionally, unique readings not found elsewhere.

When to use which reading
Although there are general rules for when to use on'yomi and when to use kun'yomi, the language is littered with exceptions, and it is not always possible for even a native speaker to know how to read a character without prior knowledge (this is especially true for names, both of people and places); further, a given character may have multiple kun'yomi or on'yomi. When reading Japanese, one primarily recognizes words (multiple characters and okurigana) and their readings, rather than individual characters, and only guess readings of characters when trying to "sound out" an unrecognized word.

Homographs exist, however, which can sometimes be deduced from context, and sometimes cannot, requiring a glossary. For example,  may be read either as kyō "today (informal)" (special fused reading for native word) or as konnichi "these days (formal)" (on'yomi); in formal writing this will generally be read as konnichi.

In some cases multiple readings are common, as in  "pork soup", which is commonly pronounced both as ton-jiru (mixed on-kun) and buta-jiru (kun-kun), with ton somewhat more common nationally. Inconsistencies abound—for example  gyū-niku "beef" and  yō-niku "mutton" have on-on readings, but  buta-niku "pork" and  tori-niku "poultry" have kun-on readings.

The main guideline is that a single kanji followed by okurigana (hiragana characters that are part of the word)—as used in native verbs and adjectives—always indicates kun'yomi, while kanji compounds (kango) usually use on'yomi, which is usually kan-on; however, other on'yomi are also common, and kun'yomi are also commonly used in kango.

For a kanji in isolation without okurigana, it is typically read using their kun'yomi, though there are numerous exceptions. For example,  "iron" is usually read with the on'yomi tetsu rather than the kun'yomi kurogane.

Okurigana (送り仮名) are used with kun'yomi to mark the inflected ending of a native verb or adjective, or by convention. Note that Japanese verbs and adjectives are closed class, and do not generally admit new words (borrowed Chinese vocabulary, which are nouns, can form verbs by adding  at the end, and adjectives via  -no or  -na, but cannot become native Japanese vocabulary, which inflect). For example:  aka-i "red",  atara-shii "new",  mi-ru "(to) see". Okurigana is also used for some nouns and adverbs, as in  nasake "sympathy",  kanarazu "invariably", but not for  kane "money", for instance. Okurigana is an important aspect of kanji usage in Japanese; see that article for more information on kun'yomi orthography

Though again, exceptions abound, for example,  jōhō "information",  gakkō "school", and  shinkansen "bullet train" all follow this pattern. This isolated kanji versus compound distinction gives words for similar concepts completely different pronunciations. "north" and  "east" use the kun'yomi kita and higashi, being stand-alone characters, but  "northeast", as a compound, uses the on'yomi hokutō. This is further complicated by the fact that many kanji have more than one on'yomi:  is read as sei in  sensei "teacher" but as shō in  isshō "one's whole life". Meaning can also be an important indicator of reading;  is read i when it means "simple", but as eki when it means "divination", both being on'yomi for this character.

These rules of thumb have many exceptions. Kun'yomi compound words are not as numerous as those with on'yomi, but neither are they rare. Examples include  tegami "letter",  higasa "parasol", and the famous  kamikaze "divine wind". In general, compounds coined in Japan using japanese roots will be read in kun'yomi while those imported from China will be read in on'yomi.

Similarly, some on'yomi characters can also be used as words in isolation:  ai "love",  Zen,  ten "mark, dot". Most of these cases involve kanji that have no kun'yomi, so there can be no confusion, although exceptions do occur. Alone  may be read as kin "gold" or as kane "money, metal"; only context can determine the writer's intended reading and meaning.

Multiple readings have given rise to a number of homographs, in some cases having different meanings depending on how they are read. In addition,  has the reading umai (skilled). More subtly,  has three different readings, all meaning "tomorrow": ashita (casual), asu (polite), and myōnichi (formal). Furigana (reading glosses) is often used to clarify any potential ambiguities.

Conversely, in some cases homophonous terms may be distinguished in writing by different characters, but not so distinguished in speech, and hence potentially confusing. In some cases when it is important to distinguish these in speech, the reading of a relevant character may be changed. More informally, in legal jargon  "preamble" and  "full text" are both pronounced zen-bun, so  may be pronounced mae-bun for clarity, as in "Have you memorized the preamble [not 'whole text'] of the constitution?". As in these examples, this is primarily using a kun'yomi for one character in a normally on'yomi term.

As stated above, jūbako and yutō readings are also not uncommon. Indeed, all four combinations of reading are possible: on-on, kun-kun, kun-on and on-kun.

Legalese
Certain words take different readings depending on whether the context concerns legal matters or not. For example:

For legal contexts where distinction must be made for homophonous words such as baishun and karyō, see Ambiguous readings below.

Ambiguous readings
In some instances where even context cannot easily provide clarity for homophones, alternative readings or mixed readings can be used instead of regular readings to avoid ambiguity. For example:

Place names
Several famous place names, including those of Japan itself ( Nihon or sometimes Nippon), those of some cities such as Tokyo ( Tōkyō) and Kyoto ( Kyōto), and those of the main islands Honshu ( Honshū), Kyushu ( Kyūshū), Shikoku ( Shikoku), and Hokkaido ( Hokkaidō) are read with on'yomi; however, the majority of Japanese place names are read with kun'yomi:  Ōsaka,  Aomori,  Hakone. Names often use characters and readings that are not in common use outside of names. When characters are used as abbreviations of place names, their reading may not match that in the original. The Osaka and Kobe baseball team, the Hanshin Tigers, take their name from the on'yomi of the second kanji of Ōsaka and the first of Kōbe.

Japanese family names are also usually read with kun'yomi:  Yamada,  Tanaka,  Suzuki. Japanese given names often have very irregular readings. Although they are not typically considered jūbako or yutō, they often contain mixtures of kun'yomi, on'yomi and nanori, such as  Daisuke [on-kun],  Natsumi [kun-on]. Being chosen at the discretion of the parents, the readings of given names do not follow any set rules, and it is impossible to know with certainty how to read a person's name without independent verification. Parents can be quite creative, and rumours abound of children called  Āsu ("Earth") and  Enjeru ("Angel"); neither are common names, and have normal readings chikyū and tenshi respectively. Some common Japanese names can be written in multiple ways, e.g. Common patterns do exist, however, allowing experienced readers to make a good guess for most names. To alleviate any confusion on how to pronounce the names of other Japanese people, most official Japanese documents require Japanese to write their names in both kana and kanji.

Chinese place names and Chinese personal names appearing in Japanese texts, if spelled in kanji, are almost invariably read with on'yomi. Especially for older and well-known names, the resulting Japanese pronunciation may differ widely from that used by modern Chinese speakers.

Today, Chinese names that are not well known in Japan are often spelled in katakana instead, in a form much more closely approximating the native Chinese pronunciation. Alternatively, they may be written in kanji with katakana furigana. Many such cities have names that come from non-Chinese languages like Mongolian or Manchu. Examples of such not-well-known Chinese names include:

Internationally renowned Chinese-named cities tend to imitate the older English pronunciations of their names, regardless of the kanji's on'yomi or the Mandarin or Cantonese pronunciation, and can be written in either katakana or kanji. Examples include:

Notes: 
Guangzhou, the city, is pronounced Kōshū, while Guangdong, its province, is pronounced Kanton, not Kōtō (in this case, opting for a Tō-on reading rather than the usual Kan-on reading).
Kaohsiung was originally pronounced Takao (or similar) in Hokkien and Japanese. It received this written name (kanji/Chinese) from Japanese, and later its spoken Mandarin name from the corresponding characters. The English name "Kaohsiung" derived from its Mandarin pronunciation. Today it is pronounced either カオシュン or タカオ in Japanese.
Taipei is generally pronounced たいほく in Japanese.

In some cases the same kanji can appear in a given word with different readings.

Pronunciation assistance
Because of the ambiguities involved, kanji sometimes have their pronunciation for the given context spelled out in ruby characters known as furigana, (small kana written above or to the right of the character) or kumimoji (small kana written in-line after the character). This is especially true in texts for children or foreign learners. It is also used in newspapers and manga for rare or unusual readings, or for situations like the first time a character's name is given, and for characters not included in the officially recognized set of essential kanji. Works of fiction sometimes use furigana to create new "words" by giving normal kanji non-standard readings, or to attach a foreign word rendered in katakana as the reading for a kanji or kanji compound of the same or similar meaning.

Spelling words
Conversely, specifying a given kanji, or spelling out a kanji word—whether the pronunciation is known or not—can be complicated, due to the fact that there is not a commonly used standard way to refer to individual kanji (one does not refer to "kanji #237"), and that a given reading does not map to a single kanji—indeed there are many homophonous words, not simply individual characters, particularly for kango (with on'yomi). Easiest is to write the word out—either on paper or tracing it in the air—or look it up (given the pronunciation) in a dictionary, particularly an electronic dictionary; when this is not possible, such as when speaking over the phone or writing implements are not available (and tracing in air is too complicated), various techniques can be used. These include giving kun'yomi for characters—these are often unique—using a well-known word with the same character (and preferably the same pronunciation and meaning), and describing the character via its components.

Dictionaries
In dictionaries, both words and individual characters have readings glossed, via various conventions. Native words and Sino-Japanese vocabulary are glossed in hiragana (for both kun and on readings), while borrowings (gairaigo)—including modern borrowings from Chinese—are glossed in katakana; this is the standard writing convention also used in furigana. By contrast, readings for individual characters are conventionally written in katakana for on readings, and hiragana for kun readings. Kun readings may further have a separator to indicate which characters are okurigana, and which are considered readings of the character itself. Further, kanji dictionaries often list compounds including irregular readings of a kanji.

Local developments and divergences from Chinese
Since kanji are essentially Chinese hanzi used to write Japanese, the majority of characters used in modern Japanese still retain their Chinese meaning, physical resemblance with some of their modern traditional Chinese characters counterparts, and a degree of similarity with Classical Chinese pronunciation imported to Japan from 5th to 9th century. Nevertheless, after centuries of development, there is a notable number of kanji used in modern Japanese which have different meaning from hanzi used in modern Chinese. Such differences are the result of:
 the use of characters created in Japan,
 characters that have been given different meanings in Japanese, and 
 post-World War II simplifications (shinjitai) of the character.

Likewise, the process of character simplification in mainland China since the 1950s has resulted in the fact that Japanese speakers who have not studied Chinese may not recognize some simplified characters.

Kokuji   

In Japanese,  refers to Chinese characters made outside of China. They are primarily formed in the usual way of Chinese characters, namely by combining existing components, though using a combination that is not used in China. The corresponding phenomenon in Korea is called gukja, a cognate name; there are however far fewer Korean-coined characters than Japanese-coined ones. Other languages using the Chinese family of scripts sometimes have far more extensive systems of native characters, most significantly Vietnamese chữ Nôm, which comprises over 20,000 characters used throughout traditional Vietnamese writing, and Zhuang sawndip, which comprises over 10,000 characters, which are still in use.

Since kokuji are generally devised for existing native words, these usually only have native kun readings.

The majority of kokuji are ideogrammatic compounds, meaning that they are composed of two (or more) characters, with the meaning associated with the combination. This is in contrast to kanji generally, which are overwhelmingly phono-semantic compounds. This difference is because kokuji were coined to express Japanese words, so borrowing existing (Chinese) readings could not express these—combining existing characters to logically express the meaning was the simplest way to achieve this. Other illustrative examples (below) include  sakaki tree, formed as  "tree" and  "god", literally "divine tree", and  tsuji "crossroads, street" formed as  "road" and  "cross", hence "cross-road".

There are hundreds of kokuji in existence. Many are rarely used, but a number have become commonly used components of the written Japanese language. These include the following:

Jōyō kanji has about nine kokuji; there is some dispute over classification, but generally includes these:
   dō,  hatara(ku) "work", the most commonly used kokuji, used in the fundamental verb , included in elementary texts and on the Proficiency Test N5.
   ko(mu), used in the fundamental verb 
   nio(u), used in common verb 
   hatake "field of crops"
   sen, "gland"
   tōge "mountain pass"
   waku, "frame"
   hei, "wall"
   shibo(ru), "to squeeze" (disputed; see below); 
jinmeiyō kanji
   sakaki "tree, genus Cleyera"
   tsuji "crossroads, street"
   monme (unit of weight)
Hyōgaiji:
   shitsuke "training, rearing (an animal, a child)"

Some of these characters (for example, "gland") have been introduced to China. In some cases the Chinese reading is the inferred Chinese reading, interpreting the character as a phono-semantic compound (as in how on readings are sometimes assigned to these characters in Chinese), while in other cases (such as ), the Japanese on reading is borrowed (in general this differs from the modern Chinese pronunciation of this phonetic). Similar coinages occurred to a more limited extent in Korea and Vietnam.

Historically, some kokuji date back to very early Japanese writing, being found in the Man'yōshū, for example— iwashi "sardine" dates to the Nara period (8th century)—while they have continued to be created as late as the late 19th century, when a number of characters were coined in the Meiji era for new scientific concepts.

In Japan, the kokuji category is strictly defined as characters whose earliest appearance is in Japan. If a character appears earlier in the Chinese literature, it is not considered a kokuji even if the character was independently coined in Japan and unrelated to the Chinese character (meaning "not borrowed from Chinese"). In other words, kokuji are not simply characters that were made in Japan, but characters that were first made in Japan. This spelling was created in Edo period Japan from the ateji (phonetic kanji spelling)  for the existing word ankō by adding the  radical to each character—the characters were "made in Japan".

Kokkun 
In addition to kokuji, there are kanji that have been given meanings in Japanese that are different from their original Chinese meanings. These are not considered kokuji but are instead called kokkun and include characters such as the following:

Types of kanji by category

Han-dynasty scholar Xu Shen in his 2nd-century dictionary Shuowen Jiezi classified Chinese characters into six categories ( liùshū, Japanese:  rikusho). The traditional classification is still taught but is problematic and no longer the focus of modern lexicographic practice, as some categories are not clearly defined, nor are they mutually exclusive: the first four refer to structural composition, while the last two refer to usage.

Shōkei moji
Shōkei (Mandarin: xiàngxíng) characters are pictographic sketches of the object they represent. For example,  is an eye, while  is a tree. The current forms of the characters are very different from the originals, though their representations are more clear in oracle bone script and seal script. These pictographic characters make up only a small fraction of modern characters.

Shiji moji
Shiji (Mandarin: zhǐshì) characters are ideographs, often called "simple ideographs" or "simple indicatives" to distinguish them and tell the difference from compound ideographs (below). They are usually simple graphically and represent an abstract concept such as  "up" or "above" and  "down" or "below". These make up a tiny fraction of modern characters.

Kaii moji
Kaii (Mandarin: huìyì) characters are compound ideographs, often called "compound indicatives", "associative compounds", or just "ideographs". These are usually a combination of pictographs that combine semantically to present an overall meaning. These make up a tiny fraction of modern characters.

Keisei moji
Keisei (Mandarin: xíngshēng) characters are phono-semantic or radical-phonetic compounds, sometimes called "semantic-phonetic", "semasio-phonetic", or "phonetic-ideographic" characters, are by far the largest category, making up about 90% of the characters in the standard lists; however, some of the most frequently used kanji belong to one of the three groups mentioned above, so keisei moji will usually make up less than 90% of the characters in a text. Typically they are made up of two components, one of which (most commonly, but by no means always, the left or top element) suggests the general category of the meaning or semantic context, and the other (most commonly the right or bottom element) approximates the pronunciation. The pronunciation relates to the original Chinese, and may now only be distantly detectable in the modern Japanese on'yomi of the kanji; it generally has no relation at all to kun'yomi. The same is true of the semantic context, which may have changed over the centuries or in the transition from Chinese to Japanese. As a result, it is a common error in folk etymology to fail to recognize a phono-semantic compound, typically instead inventing a compound-indicative explanation.

Tenchū moji
Tenchū (Mandarin: zhuǎnzhù) characters have variously been called "derivative characters", "derivative cognates", or translated as "mutually explanatory" or "mutually synonymous" characters; this is the most problematic of the six categories, as it is vaguely defined. It may refer to kanji where the meaning or application has become extended. For example,  is used for 'music' and 'comfort, ease', with different pronunciations in Chinese reflected in the two different on'yomi, gaku 'music' and raku 'pleasure'.

Kasha moji
Kasha (Mandarin: jiǎjiè) are rebuses, sometimes called "phonetic loans". The etymology of the characters follows one of the patterns above, but the present-day meaning is completely unrelated to this. A character was appropriated to represent a similar-sounding word. For example,  in ancient Chinese was originally a pictograph for "wheat". Its syllable was homophonous with the verb meaning "to come", and the character is used for that verb as a result, without any embellishing "meaning" element attached. The character for wheat , originally meant "to come", being a keisei moji having 'foot' at the bottom for its meaning part and "wheat" at the top for sound. The two characters swapped meaning, so today the more common word has the simpler character. This borrowing of sounds has a very long history.

Related symbols

The iteration mark is used to indicate that the preceding kanji is to be repeated, functioning similarly to a ditto mark in English. This mark also appears in personal and place names, as in the surname Sasaki.

The way how these symbols may be produced on a computer depends on the operating system. To produce , type . Under Windows, typing  will reveal some of these symbols, while in Google IME,  may be used.

Collation
Kanji, whose thousands of symbols defy ordering by conventions such as those used for the Latin script, are often collated using the traditional Chinese radical-and-stroke sorting method. In this system, common components of characters are identified; these are called radicals. Characters are grouped by their primary radical, then ordered by number of pen strokes within radicals. For example, the kanji character , meaning "cherry", is sorted as a ten-stroke character under the four-stroke primary radical  meaning "tree". When there is no obvious radical or more than one radical, convention governs which is used for collation.

Other kanji sorting methods, such as the SKIP system, have been devised by various authors.

Modern general-purpose Japanese dictionaries (as opposed to specifically character dictionaries) generally collate all entries, including words written using kanji, according to their kana representations (reflecting the way they are pronounced). The gojūon ordering of kana is normally used for this purpose.

Kanji education

Japanese schoolchildren are expected to learn 1,026 basic kanji characters, the kyōiku kanji, before finishing the sixth grade. The order in which these characters are learned is fixed. The kyōiku kanji list is a subset of a larger list, originally of 1,945 kanji characters and extended to 2,136 in 2010, known as the jōyō kanji—characters required for the level of fluency necessary to read newspapers and literature in Japanese. This larger list of characters is to be mastered by the end of the ninth grade. Schoolchildren learn the characters by repetition and radical.

Students studying Japanese as a foreign language are often required by a curriculum to acquire kanji without having first learned the vocabulary associated with them. Strategies for these learners vary from copying-based methods to mnemonic-based methods such as those used in James Heisig's series Remembering the Kanji. Other textbooks use methods based on the etymology of the characters, such as Mathias and Habein's The Complete Guide to Everyday Kanji and Henshall's A Guide to Remembering Japanese Characters. Pictorial mnemonics, as in the text Kanji Pict-o-graphix by Michael Rowley, are also seen. 

The Japan Kanji Aptitude Testing Foundation provides the Kanji kentei ( Nihon kanji nōryoku kentei shiken; "Test of Japanese Kanji Aptitude"), which tests the ability to read and write kanji. The highest level of the Kanji kentei tests about six thousand kanji.

See also
 Chinese influence on Japanese culture
 Braille kanji
 Hanja (Korean equivalent)
 Chữ Hán (Vietnamese equivalent)
 Han unification
 Chinese family of scripts
 Japanese script reform
 Japanese typefaces (shotai)
 Japanese writing system
 Kanji of the year
 List of kanji by stroke count
 Radical (Chinese character)
 Stroke order
 Table of kanji radicals
 Rōmaji
 Cangjie

Notes

References

Citations

Sources 

 DeFrancis, John (1990). The Chinese Language: Fact and Fantasy. Honolulu: University of Hawaii Press. .
 Hadamitzky, W., and Spahn, M., (1981) Kanji and Kana, Boston: Tuttle.
 Hannas, William. C. (1997). Asia's Orthographic Dilemma. Honolulu: University of Hawaii Press.  (paperback);  (hardcover).
 Kaiser, Stephen (1991). "Introduction to the Japanese Writing System". In Kodansha's Compact Kanji Guide. Tokyo: Kondansha International. .
 Miyake, Marc Hideo (2003). Old Japanese: A Phonetic Reconstruction. New York, NY; London, England: RoutledgeCurzon.
 Morohashi, Tetsuji.  Dai Kan-Wa Jiten (Comprehensive Chinese–Japanese Dictionary) 1984–1986. Tokyo: Taishukan.
 Mitamura, Joyce Yumi and Mitamura, Yasuko Kosaka (1997). Let's Learn Kanji. Tokyo: Kondansha International. .
 Unger, J. Marshall (1996). Literacy and Script Reform in Occupation Japan: Reading Between the Lines. .

External links

 Jim Breen's WWWJDIC server used to find Kanji from English or romanized Japanese
 Change in Script Usage in Japanese: A Longitudinal Study of Japanese Government White Papers on Labor, discussion paper by Takako Tomoda in the Electronic Journal of Contemporary Japanese Studies, August 19, 2005.
 Jisho—Online Japanese dictionary

Glyph conversion
 A simple Shinjitai—Kyūjitai converter
 A practical Shinjitai—Kyūjitai—Simplified Chinese character converter
 A complex Shinjitai—Kyūjitai converter
 A downloadable Shinjitai—Kyūjitai—Simplified Chinese character converter 

 
East Asian culture
East Asia
Southeast Asia
 
Japanese writing system terms
Logographic writing systems
Japanese writing system